Aimé Michel (12 May 1919 – 28 December 1992) was a French UFO specialist, science and spirituality writer and author.

Biography 
Aimé Michel was born in Saint-Vincent-les-Forts, now known as Ubaye-Serre-Ponçon, France on 12 May 1919. After obtaining diplomas in psychology and philosophy and passing the entrance exam as a studio sound engineer in 1943, Michel joined the French radio station Radiodiffusion Française in 1944. In 1946, he worked in the research department, where he met with Pierre Schaeffer, who later founded the Groupe de Recherche de Musique Concrète.

Michel published Mystérieux Objets Célestes in 1958, which covered the 1954 wave of UFOs in France. After the publication with help from Jacques Bergier, he devised a theory called Orthoténie in a corner of a restaurant booth. Michel postulated so-called "alignments": straight lines that corresponded to large circles traced and centered on the earth. Michel claimed that UFO sightings could be clustered along these grid lines. He proposed, for example, that there was a line known as “BaVic,” pointing from Bayonne to Vichy, where, out of nine UFO observations cited in the press on 24 September 1954, six aligned (Bayonne, Lencouacq, Tulle, Ussel, Gelles, Vichy).

A member of the editorial board of Lumières dans la nuit from 1969, he wrote numerous articles on UFOs, mysticism, the animal kingdom as well as other topics in various journals. In the periodical La vie des bêtes, during the 1960s, he authored the column "Les mystères du monde animal", documenting the mysteries of the animal world. From September 26 to October 10, 1964, Aimé Michel also led cultural workshops on the theme of "Life in the Sidereal Universe", taking place under the backing of the magazine Planète at Cefalù in Sicily.

He wrote the television screenplay Mycenae, the One From the Future, which aired in 1972.

He was a friend of controversial people like Jacques Bergier and Louis Pauwels, who were arrested in 1971 for their cooperation in Planète. He self-described himself as a "pathological" rebel for his cooperation in such activities.

Bibliography

Filmography

See also 
Ufology

Notes

References

Further reading
 Picard, Michel (1996). Aimé Michel, or the quest for Superman. Orion. .
 Ribera, Antonio (1999). Letters from three heretics. .

External links 
 Article on Michel's life by Thibaut Canuti
 Articles published in Catholic France
 Collection at the Library of Congress

1919 births
1992 deaths
People from Alpes-de-Haute-Provence
Ufologists
UFO writers
French non-fiction writers
French male non-fiction writers
20th-century non-fiction writers
20th-century French male writers